Events in the year 1946 in the Republic of China. This year is numbered Minguo 35 according to the official Republic of China calendar.

Incumbents
 President – Chiang Kai-shek
 Premier – T. V. Soong
 Vice Premier – Weng Wenhao

Events

January
 19–22 January – Houma Campaign
 21 January – The establishment of Penghu County Government in Taiwan.

April
 15–17 March – Battle of Siping
April 17 – May 19 – Campaign to Defend Siping

May
 1 May
 The establishment of Taiwan Power Company in Taiwan.
 The establishment of Taiwan Cement Limited Corporation in Taiwan.
August 14 – September 1 – Datong-Puzhou Campaign
August 14 – September 22 – Battle of Huaiyin-Huai'an
August 25–31 – Battle of Rugao-Huangqiao

September
 2–8 September – Dingtao Campaign.
 22–24 September – Linfen-Fushan Campaign.

Births
 10 July – Chin Han, Shanghai-born Taiwanese actor, son of Sun Yuanliang
 5 December – Chu Ke-liang, comedian
 Tang Haoming
 Guan Guimin
 Liu Chunxian
 Dong Guishan
 Yang Xiuzhu
 Yang Xianhui

Deaths
 20 February – Li Liejun
 17 March – Dai Li
 8 April – Bo Gu, Ye Ting
 19 April – Rikichi Andō
 15 July – Wen Yiduo
 4 August – Deng Fa

See also
 List of Chinese films of the 1940s

References

 
1940s in China
1946 in Taiwan
Years of the 20th century in China
Years of the 20th century in Taiwan